The Battle of Warrington Bridge can refer to:

Battle of Warrington Bridge (1648), part of the Battle of Preston (1648)
Battle of Warrington Bridge (1651), the only successful Royalist engagement of the Worcester Campaign.